Hongyuan Securities Company Limited was a leading securities firm headquartered in Beijing. It involves in the purchase and sale of stocks, funds, warrants and bonds, the underwriting and distribution of IPO stocks as well as the investment on financial assets and derivatives. It was established in 1993 and listed on the Shenzhen Stock Exchange in 1994. It is the first securities firm listed on the stock exchange in China.

On January 2015, the company merged with Hongyuan Securities to form Shenwan Hongyuan.

References

Financial services companies of China
Defunct financial services companies of China
Government-owned companies of China
Financial services companies established in 1983
Financial services companies disestablished in 2015
Companies formerly listed on the Shenzhen Stock Exchange
Chinese companies established in 1983
Chinese companies disestablished in 2015